Tony Makes It Happen is an album by American singer Tony Bennett, originally released in 1967 on Columbia as CL 2653.

Track listing
"On the Sunny Side of the Street" (Jimmy McHugh, Dorothy Fields) - 2:21
"A Beautiful Friendship" (Donald Kahn, Stanley Styne) - 2:28
"Don't Get Around Much Anymore" (Duke Ellington, Bob Russell) - 2:02
"What Makes It Happen" (Jimmy Van Heusen, Sammy Cahn) - 2:54
"The Lady's in Love with You" (Burton Lane, Frank Loesser) - 1:43
"Can't Get Out of This Mood" (Jimmy McHugh, Frank Loesser) - 3:40
"I Don't Know Why (I Just Do)" (Fred E. Ahlert, Roy Turk) - 3:24
"I Let a Song Go Out of My Heart" (Duke Ellington, Irving Mills) - 2:00
"Country Girl" (Robert Farnon) - 3:37
"Old Devil Moon" (Burton Lane, E.Y. Harburg - 3:00
"She's Funny That Way" (Neil Moret, Richard A. Whiting) - 3:11

Personnel
Tony Bennett – vocals
Marion Evans - conductor, arranger
Bobby Tricarico - tenor sax
Joe Newman, Joe Wilder - trumpet
Urbie Green - trombone
Joe Soldo - flute
John Bunch - piano
Corky Hale - harp
Milt Hinton - bass
Sol Gubin - drums
Unidentified strings

References

1967 albums
Tony Bennett albums
Columbia Records albums